Robert Moses State Park - Long Island is a  state park in southern Suffolk County, New York. The park lies on the western end of Fire Island, one of the central barrier islands off the southern coast of Long Island, and is known for its  stretch of beaches on the Atlantic Ocean. The park is accessible from Long Island by the Robert Moses Causeway across Great South Bay.

Established as Fire Island State Park in 1908, the park is the oldest state park on Long Island. Its current name was given to honor Robert Moses, the influential mid-20th century urban planner and former president of the Long Island State Park Commission. Recently, lawmakers have suggested the park should revert to its previous name or to something that better reflects its location.

Park description

Robert Moses State Park includes  of beach, which visitors can use for swimming, surfing, or fishing. Anglers may fish from either the beach or the piers. A day use boat basin that can accommodate up to 40 boats is also available. Guests can also use the four bathhouses on the property. The park also contains four concession stands (one at each field), volleyball courts, first aid stations, picnic areas, and a playground at Field 5.

On the west end of the park is an 18-hole pitch and putt golf course. The secluded course is set among native trees and beach vegetation. It is typically open April through November and equipment rental is available.

Robert Moses State Park also facilitates access to the Fire Island National Seashore, immediately east of the park. Since there is no parking at the Seashore itself, many visitors park at Field 5 in order to walk to Lighthouse Beach, the Fire Island Lighthouse and Museum, or the nearby community of Kismet. In 2010, New York State officials estimated about 30% of the users of Field 5 park there to access Lighthouse Beach and the Lighthouse itself. Lighthouse Beach was historically a clothing optional beach; however, the National Park Service has enforced a ban on public nudity at Lighthouse Beach since 2013, citing concerns over increases in lewd behavior prior to the ban. Violators face a maximum penalty of a $5,000 fine and six months in prison.

Access and hours
The park is accessible by automobile from the Robert Moses Causeway, which connects Fire Island with mainland Long Island. Parking is available in four separate fields. Parking fields 2, 4 and 5 have a capacity of roughly 1,000 vehicles while the capacity at Field 3 is 500. Suffolk Transit's S47 route also serves the beach seasonally connecting it with the Babylon Long Island Rail Road station on the Babylon Branch.

The park is open year-round from sunrise to sunset, although hours for activities such as swimming and golfing vary by season. Portions of the park are open 24 hours a day to fishermen with the appropriate permit.

Starting in early April, visitors are charged a fee for parking at the park. As of 2015, vehicle fees are $8 from 8 a.m. to 4 p.m. on weekends from mid-April until Memorial Day, after which a $10 fee is charged from 7 a.m. to 6 p.m. on weekends and holidays, and a $10 fee is charged on weekdays from 8 a.m. to 4 p.m. After Labor Day weekend, vehicle fees are once again $8 from 8 a.m. to 4 p.m. on weekends only, until mid-November when fees are no longer charged.

History

The west end of Fire Island was part of a colonial grant to William "Tangier" Smith.

In 1892, fears of a cholera epidemic spread by passengers on ships arriving in New York prompted the state to acquire the hotel property to establish a quarantine station. Irate local citizens obtained an injunction blocking the quarantine station and occupied the site despite the arrival of troops.

In 1908, Governor Charles Evans Hughes signed legislation designating the former Surf Hotel property as Long Island's first state park, known then as Fire Island State Park. At the time of the park's establishment, the island's western tip was near where the park's water tower stands today.

A 1918 fire destroyed the boardwalk and the few buildings on the site. In 1924, the state established the Long Island State Park Commission headed by Robert Moses as part of a statewide park and parkway program, also run by Moses. The commission obtained from the federal government  of beach west of the lighthouse that had been formed by shifting sand. In 1926 the first bathhouse was erected.

In 1940, the first modern bathhouse opened to the public, replacing facilities destroyed by the hurricane.

Ferry service was maintained from Babylon to the park until 1964 when the Robert Moses Causeway opened. The park was renamed for Moses that same year. Attendance boomed, and three parking fields with bathhouses were added.

Robert Moses State Park celebrated its 100th anniversary on June 27, 2008. The anniversary coincided with the completion of several improvements at the park, including a $700,000 rehabilitation of the bathhouse at Field 3. The renovation improved and expanded  bathroom facilities, repaired the park's cupola and clock, and replaced a glass and metal storefront added to the building in the 1980s with a new exterior consistent with the building's original architecture. The renovations were part of $132 million in improvements for New York's state parks and historic sites enacted in 2008.

In 2013, a $7.7 million dredging and beach restoration project was conducted to replenish beaches damaged during Hurricane Sandy.

A $1.7 million project to increase energy efficiency and install a 500-kilowatt solar photovoltaic power system at the park was announced in 2015. The planned improvements aim to make Robert Moses State Park the first energy-neutral state park in the United States.

In 2019 a proposal was made by Manhattanville representative Daniel J. O'Donnell to rename Robert Moses State Park in the light of a re-evaluation of the history of Long Island and the legacy of Robert Moses. The bill did not include a proposal for a new name. In February of 2021 the bill progressed on to the New York State Assembly calendar, where as of December 2021 it still sits.

As of 2014, the facility attracts approximately 3.5 million visitors per year.

See also
 List of New York state parks

References

External links

 New York State Parks: Robert Moses State Park - Long Island

1908 establishments in New York (state)
Beaches of Suffolk County, New York
Fire Island, New York
Parks in Suffolk County, New York
Protected areas established in 1908
Robert Moses projects
State parks of New York (state)